A Chinese puzzle ball, sometimes known as a devil's work ball, is a Chinese-made artifact that consists of a number of intricately carved concentric hollow spheres carved from a single solid block that fit within one another in a way that looks impossible. They were traditionally made of ivory. Following the international ban on the ivory trade, manufacturers of puzzle balls have tried using other materials, including bone.

They are made from a single solid ball with conical holes drilled in it, with the carver separating the different spherical shells using L-shaped tools. 3D imaging using computational tomography has been used to identify details of the manufacturing process.

See also 
 Ivory carving
 Impossible bottle

References

External links 
 

Carving
Chinese sculpture
Spheres
Ivory works of art